Stigtomta is a locality situated in Nyköping Municipality, Södermanland County, Sweden with 1,942 inhabitants in 2010. It is located around 15 kilometres outside the city centre of Nyköping.

Riksdag elections

References 

Populated places in Södermanland County
Populated places in Nyköping Municipality